is a Japanese gymnast. He has won two Olympic medals in the men's artistic team all-around – silver in 2012 (London) and gold in 2016 (Rio de Janeiro).

Career 
Yamamuro won the bronze medal in men's all-around at the 2011 World Championships.

Yamamuro competed for the national team at the 2012 Summer Olympics in the Men's artistic team all-around. In the team final, he injured his ankle on the vault event, and had to be helped off. He had qualified for the individual all-around final, but due to the injury was unable to compete. This gave a chance for his teammate Kazuhito Tanaka to compete - he had ranked behind Yamamuro and Kōhei Uchimura and had not qualified due to the 2-per-country rule.

Yamamuro also participated in the 2012 American Cup.

At the 2016 Summer Olympics in Rio de Janeiro, Yamamuro had won an Olympic gold medal as part of the Japanese men's artistic gymnastics national squad on the all-around team event. In that event final, Yamamuro contributed to two apparatuses on pommel horse and still rings with scores of 13.900 and 14.866 respectively.

References

Japanese male artistic gymnasts
1989 births
Living people
Olympic gymnasts of Japan
Gymnasts at the 2012 Summer Olympics
Gymnasts at the 2016 Summer Olympics
Sportspeople from Ibaraki Prefecture
Olympic gold medalists for Japan
Olympic silver medalists for Japan
Olympic medalists in gymnastics
Medalists at the 2012 Summer Olympics
Medalists at the 2016 Summer Olympics
Medalists at the World Artistic Gymnastics Championships
20th-century Japanese people
21st-century Japanese people